Dr. Chicago is an album by saxophonist Clifford Jordan which was recorded in 1984 and released on the Bee Hive label.

Reception

The AllMusic review by Scott Yanow stated, "The repertoire is colorful and diverse (three jazz standards, an obscurity, Jordan's bluesy title cut and Fournier's intriguing "Zombie"), and the very consistent Jordan is up to his usual high level".

Track listing

Personnel
Clifford Jordan – tenor saxophone
Red Rodney – trumpet, flugelhorn
Jaki Byard – piano
Ed Howard – bass
Vernel Fournier – drums

References

Clifford Jordan albums
1984 albums
Bee Hive Records albums